Tuomas Peltonen (born 19 October 1977) is a Finnish former football player who played as a goalkeeper.

Honours

Club

FC Honka
Veikkausliiga Runners-up (2): 2008, 2009
 Finnish Cup: 2012
 Finnish League Cup (2): 2010, 2011
 Ykkönen: 2005

External links
 Tuomas Peltonen at FC Honka 
 
 

1977 births
Living people
Sportspeople from Lahti
Finnish footballers
FC Honka players
FC Hämeenlinna players
Veikkausliiga players
Association football goalkeepers